Marlies Pohl (born 16 October 1955) is a German former swimmer. She competed in the women's 400 metre individual medley at the 1972 Summer Olympics.

References

External links
 

1955 births
Living people
German female swimmers
Olympic swimmers of East Germany
Swimmers at the 1972 Summer Olympics
Sportspeople from Rostock